Deutsche Rundschau is a literary and political periodical established in 1874 by Julius Rodenberg. It strongly influenced German politics, literature and culture was considered one of the most successful launches of periodicals in Germany. Among its authors were Theodor Fontane (Effi Briest), Paul Heyse, Theodor Storm (The Dykemaster), Gottfried Keller and Ernst Robert Curtius. Richard Moritz Meyer, a German literature historian, described Deutsche Rundschau as the printed university. It was circulated with interruptions during the Nazi Germany until 1964.

History
After Rodenberg's death, Bruno Hake took over as publisher, followed in 1919 by Rudolf Pechel. Until World War II, the Deutsche Rundschau was the mouthpiece of the Young Conservatives, and later of the conservative opponents of the Nazis. In 1942, Pechel was imprisoned and the periodical banned. Four years later, Deutsche Rundschau was again published by Pechel. After Pechel's death, the monthly continued to be published by his sons Jürgen and Peter Pechel, and by Harry Pross. Burghard Freudenfeld and Hans-Joachin Netzer were the last editors. The magazine ceased publication in 1964.

The tradition of the Deutsche Rundschau is continued by its sequel germanpages.de -- Deutsche Rundschau a multi-lingual online magazine edited by Heinrich von Loesch. In this revised modern format, the Deutsche Rundschau continues its history as a family-edited publication, maintaining the tradition of non-partisan reporting on a wide range of political, economic and cultural issues relevant to Germany and its role in the world.

Several other publications also used the title "Deutsche Rundschau", among them: Deutsche Rundschau, Harvey, North Dakota (1915–17); Deutsche Rundschau, Cuero, Texas (1880-ca. 1900); Deutsche Rundschau in Polen (1939);

References

1874 establishments in Germany
1964 disestablishments in West Germany
Conservative magazines published in Germany
Defunct literary magazines published in Germany
Defunct political magazines published in Germany
English-language magazines
German-language magazines
Magazines established in 1874
Magazines disestablished in 1964
Multilingual magazines
Monthly magazines published in Germany
News magazines published in Germany